The 2012 Rolex 24 at Daytona was a long-distance motor race for sports cars conforming to the regulations of the Grand-Am Road Racing series. The race was held over a duration of 24 hours, starting at 3:30pm on Saturday, January 28, finishing at 3:30pm the following day. The race was held on the sports car version of Daytona International Speedway, which includes only a portion of the NASCAR Superspeedway course and a loop of circuit which winds through the infield of the speedway.

2012 was the 50th running of the race which had begun as a three-hour duration sports car race in 1962. The race was also the opening round of the 2012 Rolex Sports Car Series season. A field of 14 Daytona Prototypes took the start of the race along with a grid of 44 of the slower roadcar-based Grand Touring class cars.

This race also was part of the inaugural North American Endurance Championship.

Qualifying
Pole position for the race was taken by British racing driver Ryan Dalziel driving the Starworks Motorsport run Riley Technologies Mk.XXVI Daytona Prototype sports car recording a lap time of 1:41.119.

In the Grand Touring class, pole was claimed by the Brumos Racing Porsche 911 GT3 Cup driven by American driver Andrew Davis.

Winners
The Michael Shank Racing entry of A. J. Allmendinger, Justin Wilson, Oswaldo Negri Jr., and John Pew took victory in their No. 60 Riley Mk. XXVI Ford, completing 761 laps over the course of the 24-hour race. They enjoyed a spirited battle with the No. 8 Starworks Motorsport Riley Mk. XXVI Ford of Ryan Dalziel, Lucas Luhr, Allan McNish, Enzo Potolicchio, and Alex Popow, which led the most laps and posted the quickest time of the race, but suffered a minor accident in the 17th hour.

In GT, Magnus Racing earned its first-ever Rolex Sports Car Series victory, with the lineup of Richard Lietz, Andy Lally, René Rast, and John Potter in the No. 44 Porsche 911 GT3 Cup car. It was Lally's fourth Rolex 24 class victory, and the first for the other three drivers.

Race results
Class winners in bold.

References

24 Hours of Daytona
Daytona 24
Daytona
Daytona 24